Marshal of the Sri Lanka Air Force is the highest rank in the Sri Lanka Air Force. Marshal of the Air Force is ranked immediately above Air Chief Marshal, and has been awarded only once, to Roshan Goonetileke as an honorary rank. It is equivalent to Field Marshal in the Army and Admiral of the Fleet in the Navy.

References

Marshals of the Sri Lanka Air Force
Sri Lanka Air Force